Ralph Gilmour Brooks (July 6, 1898September 9, 1960) was an American Democratic politician who served as the 29th Governor of Nebraska.

Early life
Brooks was born in Eustis, Nebraska. His father was a farmer and operated a store. Brooks' family lived in Kearney, Elm Creek, and Sargent during his childhood. He graduated from Sargent High School in 1916, and taught in Cherry and Custer County Schools.

Brooks enrolled in Nebraska Wesleyan University in 1920, and earned many debate honors. He won the National Oratorical Peace Contest in 1923. He was a member of the College Council, Theta Chi, assistant editor of the college paper, and employed by the State Highway Department as Associate Editor of the department magazine. After graduating in 1925, he attended the University of Nebraska College of Law and was admitted to the Nebraska Bar Association in 1930.

Career
While teaching at Hartington, Nebraska, Brooks earned a Master of Arts in school administration in 1932 from the University of Nebraska–Lincoln. He served at a number of high schools in Nebraska and Iowa, and married Darleene L. Day on December 24, 1934.  The couple had one child.

In 1942, he sought and won the Democratic nomination for Congress in the first district, but lost to the Republican, Carl Curtis, in the general election.  Moving to McCook, Nebraska in 1946, he became Superintendent of Schools and President of McCook Junior College.

Winning the Democratic nomination, Brooks was elected Governor of Nebraska by popular vote on November 4, 1958. While he was in office, he promoted industrial growth, endorsed a traffic safety program, and fought for accelerated Interstate Highway construction.

In 1960, Brooks ran for Nebraska's Senate Seat held by Carl Curtis, Brooks won the primary, defeating Clair Armstrong Callan, but died on September 9, 1960, at the age of 62.

Death
While still in office, Brooks died on September 9, 1960. He is interred at Lincoln Memorial Park, Lincoln, Lancaster County, Nebraska USA.

References

External links
 
 
 National Governors Association
 

1898 births
1960 deaths
People from Frontier County, Nebraska
Nebraska Wesleyan University alumni
University of Nebraska–Lincoln alumni
School superintendents in Nebraska
Democratic Party governors of Nebraska
Nebraska lawyers
People from Hartington, Nebraska
People from McCook, Nebraska
20th-century American politicians
20th-century American educators
20th-century American lawyers